Sammer is a surname. Notable people with the surname include:

Klaus Sammer (born 1942), German soccer player and coach
Markus Sammer (born 1988), Austrian bobsledder
Matthias Sammer (born 1967), German soccer player and coach

See also
Samer (name)
Sammes